Saratov Bridge (Sarátovskij most), crossing the Volga River in Saratov, Russia was the longest bridge in the Soviet Union upon its inauguration in 1965. It connects Saratov on the right (west) bank of the Volga, with the city of Engels on the left (east) bank.

The construction of it started in late 1990s and by the year 2000, the first part was accomplished and set for use. The second part was completed and opened on 16 October 2009.

References

External links
 Bridge "Saratov-Engels"
 A new Saratov Bridge at the village Pristannoye
 Saratov Bridge

Bridges built in the Soviet Union
Road bridges in Russia
Bridges completed in 1965
Bridges completed in 2009
Buildings and structures in Saratov Oblast
Bridges across the Volga River
Transport in Saratov Oblast